Stainforth is a surname, and may refer to:

 Charles Stainforth (1914–2000), British army officer
 Francis Stainforth (1797–1866), British cleric and collector
 George Stainforth (1899–1942), British Royal Air Force pilot
 Martin Stainforth (1866–1957), British artist
 Robert Masterman Stainforth (1915–2002), micropaleontologist and stratigrapher